Houston Ranger Station Historic District is a national historic district located in Mark Twain National Forest near Houston, Texas County, Missouri.  The district encompasses five frame and limestone buildings constructed by the Lynchburg Camp of the Civilian Conservation Corps (CCC) during 1936 and 1937.  They are the 1 1/2-story Colonial Revival style ranger's office, 1 1/2-story Colonial Revival style dwelling, garage, warehouse and oil house.

It was listed on the National Register of Historic Places in 2003.

References

Civilian Conservation Corps in Missouri
Historic districts on the National Register of Historic Places in Missouri
Colonial Revival architecture in Missouri
Buildings and structures in Texas County, Missouri
National Register of Historic Places in Texas County, Missouri